Age of X-Man is a 2019 Marvel Comics crossover storyline featuring the X-Men. The name derive from the 1995 storyline Age of Apocalypse, but instead focus on a utopian alternate universe led by the X-Man, Nate Grey.

Publication history
The X-Men comics got a franchise-wide relaunch in 2018. The ongoing titles X-Men Gold, X-Men Blue, and X-Men Red were closed, and Uncanny X-Men was relaunched instead. This comic started the arc "X-Men Disassembled", and the press release said that it was "an epic tale of mystery and tragic disappearance, with an adventure so earth-shattering, it could very well be the X-Men’s final mission". This comic was written by Ed Brisson, Kelly Thompson and Matthew Rosenberg, with art by Mahmud Asrar, R.B. Silva, Yildiray Cinar and Pere Pérez, all of whom had been working in X-Men comics. The arc ended with X-Man transporting most mutants into an alternate reality of his own creation; from that point on the Uncanny X-Men comic starred Cyclops, Wolverine and a handful of mutants that remained.

The storyline continued in other comic books, set in the aforementioned alternate reality: Age of X-Man: The Marvelous X-Men by Lonnie Nadler, Zac Thompson and Marco Failla, Age of X-Man: NextGen by Ed Brisson and Marcus To, Age of X-Man: The Amazing Nightcrawler by Seanan McGuire and Juan Frigeri, Age of X-Man: Prisoner X by Vita Ayala and German Peralta, and Age of X-Man: Apocalypse and the X-Tracts by Tim Seeley and Salva Espin. The story ended with the one-shot Age of X-Man Omega, that returned the mutants to their reality. The X-Men franchise had a new relaunch after it, Dawn of X, led by Jonathan Hickman.

Controversies
The comic Uncanny X-Men #5 features X-Man destroying the Padmanabhaswamy Temple, as well as other iconic places of worship, for antireligion reasons. The character said "I cleansed the world of its fake houses of worship and false prophets." Rajan Zed, the president of Universal Society of Hinduism, rejected it as offensive, and said that "Hinduism was the oldest and third largest religion of the world with about 1.1 billion adherents and a rich philosophical thought and it should not be taken frivolously. Symbols of any faith, larger or smaller, should not be mishandled."

Uncanny X-Men #17 features the death of Wolfsbane, a shape-shifting mutant, beaten to death by a mob. Commentators from Women Write About Comics, and The Beat considered the scene a case of transmisogyny, that would trivialize the violence against trans people. The writer Matthew Rosenberg apologized for it on his Twitter account. Wolfsbane would later be resurrected in the Dawn of X story line.

Titles

Prelude

Limited series

Ongoing series

One-shots

Collected editions

References

Utopian fiction